The superachromat or superachromatic lens was first conceived and developed by Maximilian Herzberger as the ultimate well-corrected lens. The color shift curve of a superachromat is a quartic, meaning that in theory four separate colors can be brought to focus in the same plane, while simultaneously correcting spherical aberration and field aberrations. This near-perfect correction of chromatic aberration is highly beneficial in film and digital multi-spectral photography, as a superachromat can focus near-infrared energy in the 0.7 to 1.0 micrometer wavelength band in the same focal plane as visible light, eliminating the need for refocusing.  Unfortunately, due to the limited selection of optical glasses and partial dispersion properties, superachromats must be manufactured with costly fluorite glasses and to very tight tolerances.

See also
Photographic lens
Achromat
Apochromat

References
Herzberger, M., and N. McClure, The design of superachromatic lenses, Appl. Opt. 2, pp. 553–560 (June 1963).
N. v. d. W. Lessing, Selection of optical glasses in superachromats, Appl. Opt. 9, 1665–1669 (1970).

External links

Tele-Superachromat T* 5,6/350 CFE

Photographic lenses